Charles Teversham (born 1 May 1968) is a South African former field hockey player who competed in the 1996 Summer Olympics.

References

External links

1968 births
Living people
South African male field hockey players
Olympic field hockey players of South Africa
Field hockey players at the 1996 Summer Olympics